Davis Township may refer to:

Arkansas
 Davis Township, Grant County, Arkansas, in Grant County, Arkansas
 Davis Township, Van Buren County, Arkansas, in Van Buren County, Arkansas

Indiana
 Davis Township, Fountain County, Indiana
 Davis Township, Starke County, Indiana

Minnesota
 Davis Township, Minnesota

Missouri
 Davis Township, Caldwell County, Missouri
 Davis Township, Henry County, Missouri
 Davis Township, Lafayette County, Missouri

North Carolina
 Davis Township, Carteret County, North Carolina, in Carteret County, North Carolina

Township name disambiguation pages